Philippe Faucon (born 26 January 1958) is a French film director, screenwriter and producer.

Life and career
Philippe Faucon was born in Oujda, the son of a French soldier and an Algerian pied-noir mother. He grew up between Morocco and Algeria, where his father did his military service. After completing his studies at Aix-Marseille University, he began to work in film and in 1984, he directed his first short film, titled La Jeunesse.

In 2015, he directed the film Fatima, which was screened in the Directors' Fortnight section at the 2015 Cannes Film Festival. For the film, he received the Louis Delluc Prize for Best Film, the César Award for Best Film and the César Award for Best Adaptation, among other awards.

Filmography

References

External links

 

1958 births
Living people
French film directors
French screenwriters
French film producers
People from Oujda